The Saxophone Concerto is a composition for alto saxophone and orchestra by the American composer John Adams.  The work was jointly commissioned by the Sydney Symphony Orchestra, the St. Louis Symphony, the Baltimore Symphony Orchestra, and Orquestra Sinfônica do Estado de São Paulo Foundation. It was given its world premiere in Sydney, Australia on August 22, 2013 by the saxophonist Timothy McAllister and Sydney Symphony Orchestra under the direction of Adams.

Composition

Background
The Saxophone Concerto was Adams's first composition following his three-hour oratorio The Gospel According to the Other Mary.  Adams, whose father played alto saxophone in swing bands during the 1930s, has cited his early exposure to such jazz saxophonists as John Coltrane, Eric Dolphy, and Wayne Shorter as inspiration for the piece.  The composer described the work's style in the score program notes, writing, "While the concerto is not meant to sound jazzy per se, its jazz influences lie only slightly below the surface." Noting the relative scarcity of saxophone concertos in the classical repertoire, Adams further remarked:
Thus, Adams stipulated that the concerto be played in the jazz style of saxophone performance, as opposed to the classical "French" style of playing typically heard in such pieces as Maurice Ravel's Boléro and Darius Milhaud's La création du monde.

The saxophonist Timothy McAllister became acquainted with the composer after performing saxophone parts in Adams's Nixon in China and City Noir.  McAllister later suggested the possibility of performing a new work by Adams, to which the saxophonist recalled, "...we were having dinners and lunches out at New World Symphony (in Miami Beach, Florida); I believe it was March of 2011. We were walking to dinner one night and he said, 'I think I should write you a piece.' I worked hard to contain my elation at the mere suggestion." McAllister continued, "I let it go, and over a year went by, and -- you know how it is with people, you kind of fall in and out of touch. I just kind of stayed on his radar as I kept doing 'City Noir,' and then in February of 2012 I received an e-mail out of the blue from him, saying that he'd finished 'The Gospel According to the Other Mary,' and he was thinking about the next project and he'd like to do a saxophone concerto in Sydney, and asked if I was free."  McAllister later described the concerto as "some of the hardest music I've ever played," adding, "It's traditional in a way that's incredibly challenging."

Structure
The Saxophone Concerto has a duration of roughly 30 minutes and is composed in two parts:
Animato: tranquillo, suave
Molto vivo: a hard, driving pulse

Instrumentation
The work is scored for alto saxophone and an orchestra comprising piccolo, two flutes, two oboes, English horn (doubling 3rd oboe), two clarinets, bass clarinet, two bassoons, three horns, two trumpets, harp, piano, celesta, and strings.

Reception
Reviewing the world premiere, Harriet Cunningham of The Sydney Morning Herald highly praised the Saxophone Concerto, writing, "Adams has thrown down the gauntlet with a solo line which demands speed, flexibility, musicality and, above all, stamina to keep going with barely a bar's rest. McAllister delivered, punching out the 'nervous bebop' sound (Adams' description) with manic intensity, like a Charlie Parker or Stan Getz solo sustained across 30 minutes."  She continued, "But the most beautiful moments were all Adams, from the brain-addling cross-rhythms of the final movement to the delicate interplay between solo saxophone and clarinet."  The work was also lauded by Charles T. Downey of The Classical Review, who observed, "Adams pushes the soloist to the edge with dizzying scales and disjunct leaping passages, often bouncing off the orchestra in syncopated or otherwise disorienting rhythmic patterns. [...] All in all, Adam's Saxophone Concerto is a worthy addition to a small but growing repertory for this instrument."  Alexandra Gardner of NewMusicBox added, "One of my favorite parts is the very opening of the piece, which sounds as if McAllister is pulling an entire orchestra out of the ground with his instrument alone."

Conversely, Andrew Clements of The Guardian called the piece "another note-spinning exercise in nostalgia" and wrote, "the solo part is expertly written for brilliant Timothy McAllister, and the music has the infectious, irresistible energy the composer generates so convincingly. But it never does anything you wouldn't expect, or reveals anything deeper beneath its shiny surfaces."  Hannah Nepil of the Financial Times similarly said the piece "doesn't have enough to say."  She added:

Recording
A recording of the work, performed McAllister and the St. Louis Symphony under the conductor David Robertson, was released through Nonesuch Records on May 6, 2014.  The disk also features Adams's 2009 symphony City Noir.  The album later won the 2015 Grammy Award for Best Orchestral Performance.

References

Concertos by John Adams (composer)
2013 compositions
Adams
Music commissioned by the Baltimore Symphony Orchestra
Music commissioned by the St. Louis Symphony
Music commissioned by the Sydney Symphony Orchestra